Cornewall is a surname. Notable people with the surname include:

 Cornewall baronets
 George Cornewall (1748–1819) – 2nd Baronet

See also
 Cornwall (disambiguation)